General Schomberg may refer to:

George Augustus Schomberg (1821–1907), Royal Marines general
Charles Schomberg, 2nd Duke of Schomberg (1645–1693), general in the Prussian, Dutch and British Armies
Frederick Schomberg, 1st Duke of Schomberg (1615–1690), English and Portuguese Army general
Meinhardt Schomberg, 3rd Duke of Schomberg (1641–1719), general in the service of Willem, Prince of Orange